Supper at Emmaus is an oil on canvas painting by Moretto da Brescia, executed c. 1526, now in the Pinacoteca Tosio Martinengo in Brescia. It was originally painted for the Church of San Luca in the city, where it was first recorded in 1630 by Bernardino Faino, who saw it in the San Sebastiano chapel.

References

1526 paintings
Paintings in the collection of the Pinacoteca Tosio Martinengo
Paintings by Moretto da Brescia
Moretto
Cats in art